Kalateh-ye Luyedani (also Romanized as Kalāteh-ye Lūyedānī) is a village in Zeberkhan Rural District, Zeberkhan District, Nishapur County, Razavi Khorasan Province, Iran. At the 2006 census, its population was 58, in 14 families.

References 

Populated places in Nishapur County